Faye J. Crosby (born July 12, 1947) is an American social psychologist and professor in the Department of Psychology at the University of California, Santa Cruz. Her research has focused on topics related to social justice, particularly affirmative action, as well as gender equality and relative deprivation. Before joining the University of California, Santa Cruz, she taught at Yale University and at Smith College. In 2005, she received the Kurt Lewin Award from the Society for the Psychological Study of Social Issues.

References

External links
Faculty page
Profile at Social Psychology Network

Living people
1947 births
American social psychologists
American women psychologists
Wheaton College (Massachusetts) alumni
Boston University alumni
University of California, Santa Cruz faculty
Yale University faculty
Smith College faculty
Social justice activists
American women academics
21st-century American women